Phoneutria keyserlingi is a species of spiders in the family Ctenidae, found in Brazil.

P. keyserlingi is venomous and should be treated with caution, studies on the other Phoneutria are scarce, however, a recent characterization of the venom of this species has shown that it contains neurotoxins similar to those isolated from Phoneutria nigriventer and that are active on the neuronal ion channels and NMDA-type glutamate receptors. CRISP-1 is a protein (basically an allergen) from the cysteine-rich P. keyserlingi venom, proteins in the CAP domain that includes CRISP have also been recruited from cephalopods, cone snails, scorpions, reptiles and ticks, the proteins in the domain CAP are allergy-inducing toxins, although their role in spider toxins has yet to be determined, CRISP-1 is known to induce a dangerous allergic reaction in humans.

See also 
 Ion channel
 Calcium channel
 Sodium channel
 Potassium channel 

References

Ctenidae
Spiders of Brazil
Spiders described in 1897